RADCAT (RADar CAlibration Target) were a pair of passive radar calibration satellites operated by the United States. They were cylinders with a cross section of 5 meters2. The first was destroyed in a launch failure in 1968; the second was launched in 1972 and remained in orbit until 2012.

References 

Spacecraft launched in 1968
Spacecraft launched in 1972
USA satellites
Radar calibration satellites